High affinity cAMP-specific 3',5'-cyclic phosphodiesterase 7A is an enzyme that in humans is encoded by the PDE7A gene. Mammals possess 21 cyclic nucleotide phosphodiesterase (PDE) genes that are pharmacologically grouped into 11 families.  PDE7A is one of two genes in the PDE7 family, the other being PDE7B. The PDE7 family, along with the PDE4 and PDE8 families, are cAMP-specific, showing little to no activity against 3', 5'-cyclic guanosine monophosphate (cGMP).

References

Further reading